Thomas Bratboel Nielsen (16 March 1974) is a former Danish cricketer.  Nielsen was a right-handed batsman who bowled right-arm fast-medium.

Farooq represented Denmark Under-19's in 4 youth One Day Internationals in 1998,  He later made his debut for Denmark in a List A match against Northamptonshire in the 1st round of the 2005 Cheltenham & Gloucester Trophy.  In his only List A match he was dismissed for a duck by Steffan Jones.  With the ball he took a single wicket at a cost of 30 runs.

References

External links
Thomas Nielsen at ESPNcricinfo
Thomas Nielsen at CricketArchive

1974 births
Living people
Danish cricketers